Yana Qaqa (Quechua yana black, qaqa rock, "black rock", also spelled Yana Khakha) is a  mountain in the Bolivian Andes. It is located in the Chuquisaca Department, Jaime Zudáñez Province, Icla Municipality. Yana Qaqa lies north of Uspha T'uqu.

References 

Mountains of Chuquisaca Department